Anthony Tyrone Slaton (born April 12, 1961) is a former American college and professional football player who was an offensive lineman in the National Football League (NFL) for six seasons during the 1980s and early 1990s.  Slaton played college football for the University of Southern California, and thereafter he played professionally for the Los Angeles Rams and Dallas Cowboys of the NFL.

Early years
Slaton was born in Merced, California. He went to Merced High School.

College career
Slaton attended the University of Southern California, where he played for the USC Trojans football team from 1980 to 1983.  As the Trojans' senior center in 1983, he received consensus first-team All-American honors.

Professional career
Slaton was drafted in the sixth round of the 1984 NFL draft by the Buffalo Bills but did not make that team's opening day roster. He played for the Los Angeles Rams between 1985 and 1989 and the Dallas Cowboys in 1990.

Personal life
He is currently the executive director at the Boys and Girls Clubs of America in Merced and participates in other local youth development initiatives.

References

1961 births
Living people
American football offensive linemen
Dallas Cowboys players
Los Angeles Rams players
USC Trojans football players
All-American college football players
People from Merced, California
Players of American football from California